General elections were held in Japan in March 1898.

Campaign
A total of 605 candidates contested the elections; the Liberal Party nominated the most with 233, Shimpotō had 174, Kokumin Kyōkai 52 and Yamashita Club 26. The remaining 118 candidates were independents.

Results

Notes

References
Robert A. Scalapino (Ed. by) Robert E. Ward (1973), Political Development in Modern Japan, United States: Princeton University Press.
Mahendra Prakash (2004), Coalition Experience in Japanese Politics: 1993-2003, New Delhi: JNU.

1898 03
Japan
1898 elections in Japan
Politics of the Empire of Japan
March 1898 events
1898